Icarus is a 2017 American documentary film by Bryan Fogel. It chronicles Fogel's exploration of the option of doping to win an amateur cycling race and happening upon a major international doping scandal when he asks for the help of Grigory Rodchenkov, the head of the Russian anti-doping laboratory. It premiered at Sundance Film Festival on January 20, 2017, and was awarded the U.S. Documentary Special Jury Award (Orwell Award). Netflix acquired the distribution rights and released Icarus globally on August 4, 2017. At the 90th Academy Awards, the film won the Academy Award for Best Documentary Feature.

Synopsis
While investigating the furtive world of illegal doping in sports, Bryan Fogel connects with Russian scientist Grigory Rodchenkov, the director of Russia's national anti-doping laboratory. Rodchenkov creates a plan for Fogel to take banned performance-enhancing drugs in a way that will evade detection from drug-testing, helping Fogel's experiment to prove that the current way athletes are tested for drugs is insufficient. As Fogel continues his training, he and Rodchenkov become friends, and Rodchenkov eventually reveals that Russia has a state-sponsored Olympic doping program that he oversees.

When allegations emerge in the international media over the possible existence of such a program, Fogel realizes that Rodchenkov is in danger of being "silenced" by the Russian government and has him flown to Los Angeles for his protection. Using Rodchenkov's knowledge of the doping program, they speak to the U.S. Department of Justice as well as the New York Times, alleging that Russia has conspired to cheat in the Olympics for decades, and he was hired to ramp up the operation after the Russian team's embarrassing performance in the 2010 Winter Olympics in Vancouver.

On camera, Rodchenkov testifies that at the 2014 Winter Olympics in Sochi, with the help of the Federal Security Service, he and his team switched steroid-tainted urine of the Russian national team with clean samples, evading positive detection. He provides spreadsheets, discs, e-mails, and more incriminating evidence of Russian involvement, forcing the World Anti-Doping Agency and the International Olympic Committee to investigate. After WADA's independent investigation confirms Rodchenkov's claims, U.S. Law Enforcement places him in protective custody. Rodchenkov's lawyer, Jim Walden, appears briefly in the film describing the threats to Rodchenkov's life and the suspicious deaths of two of Rodchenkov's associates.

The film ends stating that the Russian government continues to deny it had any involvement with the program and that Rodchenkov remains in protective custody.

Reception
On review aggregator website Rotten Tomatoes, the film holds an approval rating of 94% based on 47 reviews, with an average rating of 7.2/10. The site's critical consensus reads, "Icarus is eye-opening viewing for professional sports enthusiasts, yet it should also prove thoroughly gripping even for filmgoers who might not necessarily be drawn to the subject." On Metacritic, which assigns a normalized rating to reviews, the film has an average score of 68 out of 100, based on 16 critics, indicating "generally favorable reviews".

Writing for RogerEbert.com, Brian Tallerico gave the film 3 out of 4 stars and called it "a crackling documentary".

The trailer for the film was screened during a February 2018 meeting of the U.S. Helsinki Commission (also known as the Commission on Security and Cooperation in Europe). During that meeting, attorney Jim Walden spoke about Rodchenkov's work as well as the need for better enforcement by the World Anti-Doping Agency and the International Olympic Committee in order to eliminate corruption and restore integrity to the international athletic community.

At the 90th Academy Awards, the film won the Academy Award for Best Documentary Feature. During his on-stage acceptance remarks at the Oscar ceremony, director Bryan Fogel said:We dedicate this award to Dr. Grigory Rodchenkov, our fearless whistle-blower who now lives in great danger. We hope 'Icarus' is a wake-up call — yes, about Russia, but more than that, about the importance of telling the truth, now more than ever.

Accolades

See also
 Doping in Russia
 Garcia Report
 Richard McLaren
 2017 Sundance Film Festival

References

External links
 
 
 
 Icarus – Netflix Media Center

2017 films
2017 documentary films
Doping in Russia
Netflix original documentary films
Best Documentary Feature Academy Award winners
Documentary films about drugs
Documentary films about Russia
American sports documentary films
Films about doping
2010s English-language films
Documentary films about the Olympics
2010s American films